Marat Askarov is a chess grandmaster. He was born in June 29, 1987 and got a title of International Master in 2005 while grandmaster in 2008.

References 

Chess grandmasters
Living people
1987 births